The 551st Parachute Infantry Battalion (551st PIB) was, for many years, a little-recognized airborne forces unit of the United States Army, raised during World War II, that fought in the Battle of the Bulge. Originally commissioned to take the French Caribbean island of Martinique, they were shipped instead to Western Europe. With an initial strength of 800 officers and enlisted men, the remaining 250 members of the Battalion were ordered on 7 January 1945 to attack the Belgian village of Rochelinval over open ground and without artillery support. During the successful assault the unit lost more than half its remaining men. The Battalion was inactivated on 27 January 1945 and the remaining 110 survivors were absorbed into the 82nd Airborne Division. Virtually nothing of the unit's history was known to the American public until the 1990s when renewed interest prompted its veterans to seek recognition for their costly success at Rochelinval. The battalion was awarded a Presidential Unit Citation in 2001 recognizing its accomplishment.

Combat operations
Italian Campaign
Operation Dragoon, with Arrowhead
Battle of the Bulge

Activation and training
The 1st Battalion, 551st Parachute Infantry Regiment was activated on 26 November 1942 at Fort Kobbe in the Panama Canal Zone. Its initial cadre came from Company C of the 501st Parachute Infantry Battalion, while the rest of that battalion was absorbed into the 503rd Parachute Infantry Regiment. Its first draft of new men was gathered in the Frying Pan Area of Fort Benning, Georgia, on 30 October 1942.  Those personnel were trained as paratroopers through the Parachute School Replacement Pool in November–December 1942. Leaving Fort Benning on 11 December, they passed through Richmond and staged at Camp Patrick Henry, near Newport News, Virginia, arriving there on 13 December. While at Camp Patrick Henry, the men picked up a unique mascot, a short-haired black and tan dachshund puppy they stole from the yard of the port commander. They named her Furlough, which was the thing the men most desired. Under strict orders of secrecy, they could not wear their hard-won airborne insignia and were prohibited from leaving the base.

Prepared to take Martinique
Upon arrival in Panama, they trained for approximately eight months in jungle warfare to prepare for a planned invasion of the Vichy French island of Martinique begun. On 13 May 1943, the Battalion was put on alert for a possible drop on Martinique. The island was being utilized as a re-supply base for German U-boat submarines in the Caribbean Sea. The Battalion's presence in Panama had been kept secret until around that time, when they were part of a special review in Balboa, Panama for the president of Colombia. Publicizing their presence at this point was part of an effort to put psychological pressure on the Vichy administration in Martinique. Before the mission could be initiated, the island government joined the Free French in 1943, and the invasion was canceled.

The battalion left Panama in August 1943. En route, the ship's crew discovered the dog, and the ship's Master-at-Arms ordered the dog thrown overboard. Lieutenant Colonel Wood Joerg, the Battalion's commanding officer, earned a great deal of his men's loyalty and fierce respect when he successfully faced down the Master, risking a court-martial, and the crew was able to keep their mascot. They arrived at Camp Mackall, North Carolina, the same month. The 551st Parachute Infantry Regiment never gained regimental strength and was re-designated as the 551st Parachute Infantry Battalion.

Origin of their nickname
One of Colonel Joerg's favorite expressions was "Get off your ass!”. Given the Army's penchant for acronyms, soon the men were referring to themselves as "GOYA birds", or simply GOYAs.

Return to the United States

On 20 August 1943, the Battalion along with their sister unit, the 550th Airborne Infantry Battalion was sent to Camp Mackall, North Carolina for additional training. Lieutenant Colonel Rupert D. Graves replaced Lieutenant Colonel Wood Joerg in October 1943. This including training in night jumping on 16 February 1944. While at Camp Mackall the battalion was assigned to the Airborne Command. The unit underwent intense training and was selected to participate in testing the feasibility of using gliders as paratroop transport. The battalion received a personnel commendation from Major General Elbridge Chapman, commander of Airborne Command.

During training in North Carolina, the 551st PIB were the first American paratroopers to jump out of military gliders. The experiment was a failure as there was no slipstream leading the men to fall straight, and the glider's flimsy construction led to the anchor line cable ripping out of the inside when the men jumped.

In March 1944, Lieutenant Colonel Joerg rejoined the unit, and on 23 April 1944, the Battalion departed Norfolk, Virginia for Italy. Transiting through Oran, North Africa, the Battalion arrived in Naples on 23 May 1944. They trained at Camp Wright in Trapani and Marsala, Sicily during June 1944, before moving to Lido di Roma, near Rome in July. The 551st was attached to six different American units during World War II.

Combat in southern France

As a non-divisional unit for the entire war, the Battalion was attached to the provisional 1st Airborne Task Force for the Allied invasion of southern France in August 1944. On 15 August 1944, the 551st finally got into the war with their first combat jump during Operation Dragoon. They liberated Draguignan, France on 15 August 1944 and on 29 August, they liberated Nice.

From 15 August 1944 through 17 November 1944, the 551st, along with the 509th Parachute Infantry Battalion and the 550th Airborne Infantry Battalion, protected the right flank of the U.S. Seventh Army in the French-Italian Alps as mountain troops against the Austrian 5th Gebirgsjaeger Division. On 22 November 1944 the Battalion was attached to the U.S. 101st Airborne Division. The Battalion then moved to Laon in northern France on 8 December 1944, and on 19 December 1944 were suddenly summoned to help stem the Ardennes offensive.

The Battle of the Bulge

On 21 December the 551st Parachute Infantry Battalion was reassigned to the U.S. 30th Infantry Division reinforcing their positions in and around Rahier, Stoumont, La Gleize, Francorchamps, Ster and Stavelot, Belgium. The 551st Parachute Infantry Battalion arrived in Werbomont, Belgium and entered the Battle of the Bulge on 21 December 1944 with a strength of more than 643 officers and enlisted men. The 551st were the initial spearhead in U.S. XVIII Airborne Corps's counter-offensive on the northern shoulder of the Bulge. Their first days in the Battle of the Bulge were, according to paratrooper Don Garrigues, miserable: "no sleep, frozen feet, trench foot, knee deep snow, cold food and hallucinations." He had a vivid memory of that Christmas Eve:

On 26 December, they reported near Basse-Bodeux to the 508th Parachute Infantry Regiment, part of the U.S. 82nd Airborne Division. They received a visit from Major General James Gavin, commanding general of the 82nd Airborne, who visited their bivouac at Rahier on 27 December. He told the Battalion that it had been chosen to make the initial "raid in force" against the Germans. He told them they would be the unit who was going to turn the battle around. He stressed that they might take very heavy casualties but that a great deal depended on the outcome. Their task was to pass through the U.S. Army's forward lines, cross about  into German-held territory, and attack and reduce the German-held village of Noirefontaine. They were then to return to base with prisoners for interrogation.

The evening of the next day they carried out the raid against the Oberst Friederich Kittel's 62nd Volksgrenadier Division in the tiny hamlet of Noirefontaine, taking 18 casualties in the process. They faced Kittel's stubborn troops again. From 3–8 January 1945, they assaulted the small hamlets of Mont-de-Fosse, St. Jacques, and Dairomont. According to the unit's Presidential Unit Citation, "On 4 January, the battalion conducted a rare fixed bayonet attack of machine gun nests that killed 64 Germans." Fighting through the thick woods cost the 551st heavy casualties. On the morning of 7 January, down to only 250 men, they were next charged with taking the village of Rochelinval, Belgium, along the Salm River.

The defending 183rd Volksgrenadier Regiment was backed up by a regiment of 88mm guns and a battalion of 105mm howitzers. Colonel Joerg had requested preparatory artillery which was not forthcoming. He requested that the attack be delayed, and his request was denied. He thought the attack, down slope by his un-camouflaged men in the daylight across a half-mile expanse of foot-deep snow at a concealed, alert enemy, to be suicidal. Their only cover would be their 81mm mortars. Paratrooper Don Garrigues wrote:

Relieved on 9 January 1945, of the 643 men who entered the battle on 3 January, only 14 Officers and 96 men remained. "Nowhere were casualties higher than in Wood Joerg's 551st Battalion." Like the independent 509th Infantry Battalion, the unit's strength had been overwhelmed by battle, and paratrooper replacements were not in the pipeline.

Battalion disbanded
On 27 January 1945, in Juslenville, Belgium, General James M. Gavin informed the remaining men that the battalion was being inactivated and all remaining soldiers would be absorbed into the 82nd Airborne Division. The unit records were absorbed into the 82nd Airborne and virtually lost for many years, their sacrifice unknown to many.

Casualties
Because the unit was disbanded and its remaining men absorbed into various units, U.S. Army records on the number of casualties are conflicting.

KIA: 66, WIA: (TBD); NBC: (TBD)

Citations

DSC: (2); Silver Star: (1); Bronze Star: (1)

Army Chief of Staff Gen. Eric K. Shinseki awarded the Presidential Unit Citation for extraordinary heroism during the Battle of the Bulge to the unit during an official ceremony at the Pentagon on 23 February 2001.

Cultural legacy

Many WWII momentos and memorabilia including uniforms, helmets, equipment are on display at December 44 Museum, at La Gleize, Belgium. It includes the unit commander Lt. Col. Wood G. Joerg's signature beret (killed on 7 January 1945 at Rochelinval)

A monument was built at Leignon, Belgium, to memorialize Pfc Milo Huempfner, who was awarded the Distinguished Service Cross for action there on 23 December 1944.

A plaque was dedicated in Noirefontaine, Belgium to the 551st Parachute Infantry Battalion and the civilians of the area.

A plaque dedicated in La Chapelle, Belgium in the town hall to the 551st Parachute Infantry Regiment.

A memorial stone was placed at Fort Benning, Georgia, honoring the Battalion. It is notable because it includes a statue of their dog mascot, Furlough.

In Rochelinval, Belgium a plaque was dedicated on 20 August 1989 to the 551st Parachute Infantry Battalion from the Belgian people. A Stele to Lt. Col. Wood G. Joerg who was killed on 7 January 1945, and to the 551st Parachute Battalion Combat Team. On 18 February 2001, a plaque was added to the stele with the Presidential Unit Citation. In February 2000, a plaque was dedicated to Bill Tucker, "Tucker's House," and to his I Company, 505th Parachute Regiment.
In 2010 another plaque was added in memory of Sgt. Robert Hill, who was killed on 7 January 1945 in Rochelinval. For his heroïc actions on that day he was awarded the DSC.

In the SandHill Game land on the west side of Camp Mackall, NC a monument was dedicated (1 JULY 1992) to the heroic men of the 551st PIB.  This monument is also dedicated to the memory of the 8 Paratroopers that drowned in Lake Kinney Cameron Lake during a night jump on 16 FEBRUARY 1944.

There is a monument located next to the house that served as former medical aidstation at Dairomont. This monument is dedicated to the 551st and their legendary bayonet charge at German machinegun positions in the woods nearby the monument.

References

Further reading 
De Trez, Michel; First Airborne Task Force, Brussels, Belgium; D-Day Publishing, 1998.
Dillard, Doug, COL (USA Ret); USA Airborne, 50th Anniversary: The 551st Parachute Infantry Battalion, Paducah, Kentucky, Turner Publishing Company, 1990.
Gassend, Jean-Loup; Autopsy of a Battle, the Allied Liberation of the French Riviera, Atglen, PA; Schiffer Publishing, 2014.
Hughes, Lee; The 551st Infantry Battalion 2007
Morgan, Dan; Left Corner of My Heart, Wauconda, Washington; Alder Enterprises, 1984.
Orflea, Gregg; Messengers of the Lost Battalion, Free Press, New York, New York, 1997.
Tucker, Bill; Rendezvous at Rochelinval, Harwichport, Massachusetts; International Airborne Books, 1999.
The History Channel, Suicide Missions: Winter Warriors, 2000
Brion, Patrick; GOYA, the story of Joseph Cicchinelli
Hainaut, Pascal; Sur les pas d'un parachutiste Américan

External links
 551st PIB website
551st Parachute Infantry Collection at the United States Army Center of Military History
 Website of 551st veteran Joe Cicchinelli

Military units and formations established in 1942
African-American history of the United States military
Infantry battalions of the United States Army
Battalions of the United States Army in World War II
551
Military units and formations disestablished in 1945